Benny C. Petrus (born November 23, 1956) is an American politician. He was a member of the Arkansas House of Representatives, serving from 2002 to 2008. He is a member of the Democratic party.

References

Living people
Democratic Party members of the Arkansas House of Representatives
1956 births